Cottingham railway station serves the village of Cottingham in the East Riding of Yorkshire, England. Located on the Yorkshire Coast Line, it is managed by Northern. The station serves the northern suburbs of Hull and generates much commuter traffic.

History

The station was opened, along with the rest of the line from the original Hull and Selby Railway station at Manor House Street, Hull, on 6 October 1846.

The station building was designed by George Andrews, consisting of two platforms, a stationmaster's house, and waiting rooms. In addition to the passenger facilities there was a goods shed, and coal depot to the west of the line, reached by points to the north of the station. Goods transit into Cottingham included coal and building materials, whilst goods outwards from Cottingham included large amounts of agricultural produce as well as livestock. Goods traffic ended in 1970.

Halfway between Cottingham and Hull, a junction was created when a direct line was opened to the new York and North Midland Railway terminus at Hull in 1848. The original line south of Cottingham (later known as the Newington branch) was subsequently utilised as a direct route towards  and points west, bypassing the busy station at Paragon for through trains to and from the coast, and was particularly busy in the summer months but was closed to all traffic in May 1965 to allow the removal of several inconvenient level crossings along its route, leaving the 1848 line to handle all remaining services.

In 1988, the stationmaster's house, the station itself and the former goods shed were listed as a Grade II listed buildings. The footbridge on the station platform is of a standard NER cast iron pre-assembled design. The footbridge was restored by Network Rail in 2021.

Facilities
The station is not staffed, but does have a ticket machine available. There is a substantial brick shelter on platform one and two waiting shelters on platform two (the buildings on platform two are in private hands).  Passenger information screens are provided for train running details, along with timetable posters.  Step-free access to platform two is available from the station entrance, but that for platform one requires the use of the nearby level crossing.

Services
All trains on the Hull to Bridlington and Scarborough Line call here, giving the station a basic half-hourly service in each direction with several additional peak hour trains to and from Beverley. There is an hourly service each way on Sundays throughout the year since the December 2009 timetable change (see GB National Rail Timetable 43), with nine trains in each direction through to/from Scarborough. Many Hull-bound services continue onward to either  via  or  via Selby since the December 2019 timetable was introduced.

From 21 May 2017, the station began being served by one Hull Trains service to London King's Cross in the morning and Beverley in the evening. Since May 2019, this has been increased to two trains per day.

References

Sources

External links

, film of Cottingham station in 1973

Railway stations in the East Riding of Yorkshire
DfT Category F1 stations
Railway stations in Great Britain opened in 1846
Railway stations served by Hull Trains
Northern franchise railway stations
Grade II listed buildings in the East Riding of Yorkshire
Cottingham, East Riding of Yorkshire
Stations on the Hull to Scarborough line
1846 establishments in England
Former York and North Midland Railway stations
George Townsend Andrews railway stations
Grade II listed railway stations